The 1998–99 FAW Premier Cup was the second season of the tournament since its founding in 1997.

Group stage

Group A

Group B

Group C

Quarter finals

Semi finals

First leg

Second leg

Final

References

General

1998-99
1998–99 in Welsh football cups